Mohamed Rebai (born 8 May 1977) is a Tunisian fencer. He competed in the individual sabre event at the 2004 Summer Olympics.

References

External links
 

1977 births
Living people
Tunisian male sabre fencers
Olympic fencers of Tunisia
Fencers at the 2004 Summer Olympics
21st-century Tunisian people